United Nations Security Council resolution 1463, adopted unanimously on 30 January 2003, after recalling all previous resolutions on the situation in Western Sahara, particularly Resolution 1429 (2002), the Council extended the mandate of the United Nations Mission for the Referendum in Western Sahara (MINURSO) for two months until 31 March 2003.

The Security Council extended the MINURSO operation to allow Morocco and the Polisario Front time to consider proposals presented by the Secretary-General's Personal Envoy James Baker III for a political solution to the dispute. The proposal provided for the self-determination of the people of Western Sahara. In addition, the Secretary-General Kofi Annan was asked to submit a report by 17 March 2003 on the situation.

See also
 Free Zone (region)
 Political status of Western Sahara
 List of United Nations Security Council Resolutions 1401 to 1500 (2002–2003)
 Sahrawi Arab Democratic Republic
 Moroccan Western Sahara Wall
 List of United Nations resolutions concerning Western Sahara

References

External links
 
Text of the Resolution at undocs.org

 1463
 1463
 1463
2003 in Morocco
January 2003 events
2003 in Western Sahara